William D. "Bill" Magee (June 21, 1939 – December 24, 2020) was a Democratic member of the New York State Assembly, who represented the 121st Assembly District from 1991 until 2018.

Magee was a lifetime resident of the Town of Nelson. After graduating from high school, Magee earned a bachelor's degree in agricultural economics from Cornell University in 1961. He then became an auctioneer and businessman in Madison County, New York.

In 1972, Magee was elected to the Madison County Board of Supervisors, serving for 19 years until his election to the State Assembly. He also worked at the New York State Fair from 1985 to 1990.

Magee was first elected to the State Assembly in 1990. He ran uncontested in the 2008 general election and won the 2010 general election with 54 percent of the vote. In 2014 he was re-elected with 52.4 percent of the vote and in 2016 re-elected with 52.37 percent of the vote. He lost re-election in 2018 to John Salka.

References 

1939 births
2020 deaths
County legislators in New York (state)
Democratic Party members of the New York State Assembly
Cornell University College of Agriculture and Life Sciences alumni
People from Oneida, New York
People from Madison County, New York
21st-century American politicians